The 1966 United States Senate election in Maine was held on November 8, 1966. Incumbent Republican U.S. Senator Margaret Chase Smith was re-elected to a fourth term over Democratic State Senator Elmer H. Violette.

Republican primary

Candidates
 Margaret Chase Smith, U.S. Senator since 1949

Results
Senator Smith was unopposed for renomination

Democratic primary

Candidates
Jack L. Smith
Plato Truman, perennial candidate
Elmer H. Violette, State Senator from Van Buren

Results

General election

Results

See also 
 1966 United States Senate elections

References

Maine
1966